The Trofeo Papà Cervi is a one day road cycling race held annually in Italy. It was part of UCI Europe Tour in 2012 as a category 1.2 event.

Winners

References

Cycle races in Italy
UCI Europe Tour races
Recurring sporting events established in 1971
1971 establishments in Italy